The Lötschberg line is a railway in Switzerland, connecting Spiez in the canton of Bern with Brig in the canton of Valais. It crosses the Bernese Alps, from the Bernese Oberland to Upper Valais, through the Lötschberg Tunnel in the middle of the line. Together with the Simplon Tunnel south of Brig, it constitutes one of the major railways through the Alps and an important north-south axis in Europe. The Lötschberg axis is backed by the lower and longer Lötschberg Base Tunnel, part of the New Railway Links through the Alps project.

The line is famous for its double loop of spiral tunnels in the Kander Valley on its northern approach to the Lötschberg Tunnel and the climb out of the Rhone Valley on a steep mountainside through numerous tunnels and viaducts on the southern approach.

Location
It is the second most important north-south link through the Swiss Alps after the Gotthard railway. Together with the Simplon Tunnel and the Italian part of the Simplon line, it also connects the Swiss Plateau to Northern Italy. The more recent Lötschberg Base Tunnel cuts most of the open-air section of the mountain line and provides a faster access between Bern and Brig. Both tunnels run below the -high Lötschen Pass of the Lötschberg region.

The beginning of the Lötschberg line is in the rail node of Spiez, where it connects with the GoldenPass line from Zweisimmen and with the Lake Thun line from major rail hubs in northern Europe, including Basel and Bern, to Interlaken. From there the line runs generally due south through the Kander valley, passing through Mülenen, Reichenbach and Frutigen, where the northern portal of the Base Tunnel  is located. After the Kander viaduct, the mountain line continues towards Kandergrund and Mitholz. The line turns back to north after the loop of Mitholz and climbs out of the valley on the western flanks of the Ärmighorn. A spiral tunnel put the line back towards south, before it reaches Kandersteg, the last station on the northern approach. Two kilometres (1.2 mi) after Kandersteg, the line reaches the northern entrance of the Lötschberg Tunnel. Immediately after the southern entrance is the station of Goppenstein, in the lower part of the Lötschental valley. The lines then continues in the same direction, descending towards Brig. It crosses the wild valleys of Jolital, Bietschtal, Baltschiedertal and Gredetschtal, passing through Ausserberg, Eggerberg and Lalden. The line finally ends at Brig, where it connects with the Matterhorn Gotthard Bahn from Zermatt to Disentis and the Simplon line from Geneva and Lausanne to Domodossola, and further to Milan. The southern portal of the Base Tunnel lies on the Rhone valley floor, below Ausserberg. The rest of the base line passes through Visp before it reaches Brig. It is the highest line in Switzerland that is both an adhesion and a standard gauge railway, therefore usable by standard InterCity trains. The journey from Spiez to Brig lasts 72 minutes on the mountain line and 35 minutes on the base line.

The Lötschberg line stretches over the Bernese Oberland region of the northern Alps and the Upper Valais region of the inner Alps. While the north side of the Bernese Alps is wet and exposed, the south side is dry and sheltered by the high mountains of both the Bernese and Pennine Alps. This results in marked climatic, topographical and cultural contrasts between the northern and southern approaches. The line, especially its southern part, lies in close proximity to the Jungfrau-Aletsch area, a largely glaciated region between the Lötschen and Grimsel passes.

History 
The railway from Bern to Münsingen and Thun was opened in 1859 by the Schweizerische Centralbahn ("Swiss Central Railway"). This company, including the Bern–Thun line, was taken over by the Swiss Federal Railways on its establishment in 1902, although most local passenger and freight services on it are now operated by the Bern-Lötschberg-Simplon railway (BLS). In 1893 the Thunerseebahn ("Lake Thun Railway") was opened between Thun, Spiez, Interlaken and Bönigen. It was absorbed by BLS in 1913.

Around 1890 the canton of Bern began to consider the possibility of building a railway to connect with the proposed Simplon Tunnel. It was entitled under the Swiss constitution to build its own railway through the Alps. However, it was unlikely to receive financial support from the Swiss Confederation because the Swiss government had provided significant funding for the Gotthard railway; therefore Bern would have to find funds from elsewhere to build its own line to the south.

In 1891 a small group of eminent persons obtained a concession for the construction of a railway line between Spiez and Frutigen with the option of later extending it into the Valais. A retired member of the cantonal government and judge, Wilhelm Teuscher studied route options and concluded that the current route was feasible. On 25 July 1901 the railway was opened from Spiez to Frutigen as the Spiez-Frutigen-Bahn (SFB) as the first stage of the Lötschberg line.

Meanwhile, a line from Lenk im Simmental under Wildstrubel to Leukerbad in the Valais was also proposed. However, the supporters of the Lötschberg were able to raise sufficient funds to allow the Lötschberg proposal to go forward. On 27 July 1906, the Berner Alpenbahngesellschaft Bern-Lötschberg-Simplon (BLS) was founded for the construction and operation of the proposed railway and on 1 January 1907, it absorbed the Spiez-Frutigen-Bahn.

Construction
The French consortium Entreprise du Lötschberg was awarded the contract for construction of the entire Lötschberg line and construction commenced on 15 October 1906 with the drilling of the northern portal of the Lötschberg tunnel.

It was originally intended that the line be built as a single track, but during construction a decision was taken to build the Lötschberg Tunnel with double track and to prepare the approaches for duplication in the future. The track geometry of the approaches were redesigned to make possible a second track and buildings and tunnels made provision for a second track to be added. The builders established a  gauge construction railway on both approaches to the tunnel.

During the construction of the Lötschberg line, there were several fatal accidents. On the evening of 29 February 1908 the construction caused an avalanche which hit a hotel and killed 12 of its guests who were eating dinner. On 24 July 1908 a collapse caused by leaking water in the Lötschberg tunnel killed 25 people, all but three of the shift workers present. This collapse forced a detour in the tunnel around the weak strata that collapsed.

Originally it was planned to open the line on 1 March 1912, but this date was twice delayed by the decision to build double line through the main tunnel and make provision for future double track elsewhere. On 15 July 1913 electrification of the line work was completed and a limited service began. On 16 September 1913 a more complete schedule began with 16 trains, including four international express trains.

Completion of Tunnels
The date of the breakthroughs of the approach tunnels were as follows.

North side

Riedschuk tunnel,
Felsenburg tunnel II, 28 December 1910
Ronenwaldtunnel I, 15 September 1910
Ronenwald tunnel II, 30 September 1910
Rotbach tunnel, 9 September 1910
Hemligen tunnel, 10 November 1910

South side

Rotlaui tunnel, 3 April 1908
Mittalgraben tunnel, 29 March 1908
Luegje tunnel, 5 April 1908
Hohegg tunnel, 30 November 1907
Marchgraben tunnel, 13 December 1907
Hohtenn tunnel, 10 March 1908
Lidenplatten tunnel, 30 September 1907
Blasboden tunnel, 6 February 1908
Sevistein tunnel I, 17 March 1908
Mahnkinn tunnel, 29 March 1908
Stadel tunnel, 11 March 1908
Viktoria tunnel, 5 November 1907
Mundbach tunnel, 28 September 1907
Stadel tunnel, 25 November 1910
Schluchi tunnel, 8 April 1911
Bietschtal tunnel I, 29 August 1911
Bietschtal tunnel II, 21 February 1911
Sevistein tunnel II, 30 December 1911
Gründenrunnel, 11 March 1911 
Eggerberg tunnel, 24 March 1911
Bad tunnel, 31 March 1911
Sevistein tunnel III, 25 October 1915 (replacement for Sevistein tunnel I and II, damaged by a landslide)

Construction railways

For the construction of the Lötschberg line and the main tunnel two special construction railway had to be constructed to bring material from Frutigen or the junction at Naters near Brig to the portals of the Lötschberg tunnel. While on the northern approach the construction line was built on a different route to the permanent line, on the south side the construction line followed the permanent line to a large extent.

The rolling stock for the construction lines consisted of 420 waggons and 32 small steam locomotives with Klien-Lindner axles, delivered from June to November 1907 by the German firm of Orenstein & Koppel.

Northern approach
The earthworks and structures of the construction railway was completed on 30 June 1907 and on 19 August the first steam locomotive ran to the portal of the tunnel. The construction railway had numerous junctions to lines connecting to the various construction sites for the main line railway. Several wooden viaducts had to be built to climb from Blausee to Kandersteg.

Southern approach

The building of the construction railway on the south side was delayed by many appeals and the groundbreaking ceremony near Naters took place on 12 February 1907.

Finally, in August 1908, almost two years after beginning of tunnelling of the southern portal of the tunnel, the first supply train ran all the way from Naters to the portal at Goppenstein. Previously all the building supplies had to be laboriously hauled up by mule or by cart through the narrow Lonza gorge.

The footpath along the southern approach to the Lötschberg Tunnel line in some sections follows the route of the construction railway, particularly in the Bietsch and Baltschieder valleys.

Expansion of capacity

The approaches to the Lötschberg tunnel were originally single track and have subsequently been doubled. The bridges and tunnels of the line were partly designed to be doubled, but were initially not fully bored or built. Double tracking of the line was completed between 1976 and 1992. At the same time the tracks were lowered to create a continuous SIM corridor (Simplon Inter-Modal) for a rolling highway (trucks carried on flatcars) and high-cube containers. Also, the passenger train capacity was increased massively.

In mid 2007, the Lötschberg Base Tunnel was completed between Frutigen and Visp. This is the first of two new lines through the Swiss Alps as part of NRLA. As a result, the old Lötschberg line between Frutigen and Brig is used much less intensively than previously.

Current operations on the mountain line
The new base tunnel has taken almost all the long-distance passenger and a considerable part of the freight from the original Lötschberg tunnel, but was immediately saturated because a single track section reduces its capacity. Some freight trains and hourly regional express trains between Bern and Spiez to Brig called Lötschberger continue to run on the mountain railway. In addition, the car ferry continues to operate on the line between Kandersteg and Goppenstein; it is subsidized by the Swiss government to substitute for a road tunnel under the Rawil Pass that was planned in the 1970s but never built.

Data
Gauge: 
Current: 15,000 V AC 16.67 Hz
Length: 
Maximum gradient: 27 ‰ (2.7%)
Opening the line Spiez-Frutigen by the Spiez-Frutigen-Bahn: 25 July 1901
Start of construction of the line between Brig and Frutigen: 15 October 1906
Takeover of the Spiez-Frutigen-Bahn by the BLS: 1 January 1907
Breakthrough of the Lötschberg tunnel: 31 March 1911
Opening of line: 15 July 1913

See Also 

 NRLA and the Gotthard railway, Switzerland's other major Alpine freight corridor.
 Lötschberg Base Tunnel
 The Lötschberger or BLS RABe 525
 BLS AG

References

Literature

External links

The Lötschberg mountain route (BLS)

Railway lines in Switzerland
BLS railway lines
Alpine Railways connecting Italy
International Railways connecting Italy
Transport in the Alps